The One Hundred Nineteenth Ohio General Assembly was the legislative body of the state of Ohio in 1991 and 1992. In this General Assembly, the Ohio Senate was controlled by the Republicans, consisting of 19 Republicans and 14 Democrats.  The Ohio House of Representatives was controlled by the Democrats, with 62 Democrats and 37 Republicans.

Major events

Vacancies
January 3, 1991: Senator David Hobson (R-10th) resigns to take a seat in the United States House of Representatives.
April 19, 1992: Representative Russ Guerra (R-40th) dies.
April 21, 1992: Senator Paul Pfeiffer (D-15th) resigns.
June 30, 1992: Representative Joe Secrest (D-95th) resigns.
December 17, 1992: Representative Judy Sheerer (D-18th) resigns to take a seat in the Ohio Senate.
December 17, 1992: Senator Eric Fingerhut (D-25th) resigns to take a seat in the United States House of Representatives.

Appointments
January 3, 1991: Merle G. Kearns is appointed to the 10th Senatorial District due to the resignation of Dave Hobson.
April 21, 1992: Ben Espy is appointed to the 15th Senatorial District due to the resignation of Paul Pfeiffer.
June 17, 1992: Jeff Jacobson is appointed to the 40th House District due to the death of Russ Guerra.
June 30, 1992: Mike McCullough is appointed to the 95th House District due to the resignation of Joe Secrest.
December 17, 1992: Judy Sheerer is appointed to the 25th Senatorial District due to the resignation of Eric Fingerhut.

Senate

Leadership

Majority leadership
 President of the Senate: Stanley Aronoff
 President pro tempore of the Senate: Richard Finan
 Assistant pro tempore: Eugene J. Watts
 Whip: Roy Ray

Minority leadership
 Leader: Robert Boggs
 Assistant Leader: Alan Zaleski
 Whip: Bob Nettle
 Assistant Whip: Jeffrey Johnson

Members of the 119th Ohio Senate

House of Representatives

Leadership

Majority leadership
 Speaker of the House: Vern Riffe
 President pro tempore of the House: Barney Quilter
 Floor Leader: Bill Mallory
 Assistant Majority Floor Leader: Cliff Skeen
 Majority Whip: Judy Sheerer
 Assistant Majority Whip: Marc Guthrie

Minority leadership
 Leader: Corwin Nixon
 Assistant Leader: Dave Johnson
 Whip: Jo Ann Davidson
 Assistant Whip: Randy Gardner

Members of the 119th Ohio House of Representatives

Appt.- Member was appointed to current House Seat

See also
Ohio House of Representatives membership, 126th General Assembly
Ohio House of Representatives membership, 125th General Assembly
 List of Ohio state legislatures

References
Ohio House of Representatives official website
Project Vote Smart – State House of Ohio
Map of Ohio House Districts
Ohio District Maps 2002–2012
2006 election results from Ohio Secretary of State

Ohio legislative sessions
Ohio
Ohio
1991 in Ohio
1992 in Ohio
de:Repräsentantenhaus von Ohio